The 2001–02 campaign was the 96th season in Atlético Madrid's history and their 2nd season in Segunda División of Spanish football. Also the club competed in Copa del Rey.

Summary 
During summer the club with Paulo Futre as Manager appointed club legend Luis Aragonés as new coach on 31 May 2001. Previously, the former player acted as coach several seasons in the past: 1974–80, 1982–87 and 1991–93. The main reason for his arrival was clinching the last season a UEFA Champions League spot for underdogs RCD Mallorca and now has the mission of save Atletico from Segunda División. Owing to financial troubles, Futre transferred several players out the squad included top goalscorer Salva to Valencia CF in exchange for Uruguayan striker Diego Alonso young playmaker Hugo Leal to Paris Saint-Germain and another 14 players. The squad was reinforced with 4 players from RCD Mallorca and more Spanish players on the contrary of last seasons where the club bought a lot of foreign players.

Finally, on 27 April 2002 the team clinched the promotion to La Liga after two years on Segunda División. Also, in Copa del Rey the club was early eliminated by Rayo Vallecano in Round of 64.

Squad

Transfers

Competitions

Segunda División

League table

Results by round

Matches

Copa del Rey

Round of 64

Statistics

Players statistics

Squad statistics

References

External links 
 Campaign of Atlético Madrid in 2001–02 season.
 Matches of Atlético Madrid in 2001–02 season.

2001-02
Spanish football clubs 2001–02 season